Lacs District is one of fourteen administrative districts of Ivory Coast. The district is located in the central part of the country. The capital of the district is Dimbokro.

Creation
Lacs District was created in a 2011 administrative reorganisation of the subdivisions of Ivory Coast. The territory of the district was composed by merging the former regions of N'Zi-Comoé and Lacs and removing the area of the Yamoussoukro Autonomous District.

Administrative divisions
Lacs District is currently subdivided into four regions and the following departments:
 Bélier Region (region seat in Yamoussoukro, outside the district)
 Didiévi Department
 Djékanou Department
 Tiébissou Department
 Toumodi Department
 Iffou Region (region seat in Daoukro)
 Daoukro Department
 M'Bahiakro Department
 Prikro Department
 Moronou Region (region seat in Bongouanou)
 Arrah Department
 Bongouanou Department
 M'Batto Department
 N'zi Region (region seat also in Dimbokro)
 Bocanda Department
 Dimbokro Department
 Kouassi-Kouassikro Department

Moronou Region was created in 2012 as a split-off from N'Zi Region.

Population
According to the 2021 census, Lacs District has a population of 1,488,531.

References

 
Districts of Ivory Coast
States and territories established in 2011